Voltaire is a station on line 9 of the Paris Métro. The station is located in the Place Léon Blum (formerly called the Place Voltaire) along with the town hall of the 11th arrondissement, which serves a lively district.

The station was opened on 10 December 1933 with the extension of the line from Richelieu – Drouot to Porte de Montreuil. It is named after the Rue Voltaire, which is named after François-Marie Arouet (1694–1778), better known under the pen name Voltaire, a French Enlightenment writer and philosopher.

Station layout 

Paris Métro stations in the 11th arrondissement of Paris
Railway stations in France opened in 1933